The Southern Patagonian Ice Field ( or ), located at the Southern Patagonic Andes between Chile and Argentina, is the world's second largest contiguous extrapolar ice field. It is the bigger of two remnant parts of the Patagonian Ice Sheet, which covered all of southern Chile during the last glacial period, locally called the Llanquihue glaciation.

Geography

, of which 14,200 km2 belong to Chile and 2,600 km2 belong to Argentina.

The ice mass feeds dozens of glaciers in the area, among which are the Upsala (765 km2), Viedma (978 km2) and Perito Moreno (258 km2) in the Los Glaciares National Park in Argentina, and the Pío XI Glacier or Bruggen Glacier (1,265 km2, the largest in area and longest in the southern hemisphere outside of Antarctica), O'Higgins (820 km2), Grey (270 km2) and Tyndall (331 km2) in Chile. The glaciers going to the west flow into the fjords of the Patagonian channels of the Pacific Ocean; those going to the East flow into the Patagonian lakes Viedma and Argentino, and eventually, through the rivers de la Leona and Santa Cruz, to the Atlantic Ocean.

An important part of the ice field is protected under different national parks, such as the Bernardo O'Higgins and Torres del Paine in Chile, and the aforementioned Los Glaciares in Argentina.

There are two known volcanoes under the ice field; Lautaro and Viedma. Due to their inaccessibility they are among the least researched volcanoes in Chile and Argentina.

History

Exploration
Thorough explorations include the expeditions of Federico Reichert (1913–1914), Alberto de Agostini (1931), and Harold William Tilman and Jorge Quinteros (1955–1956); as well as Eric Shipton (1960–61). The first (North-South) crossing of the field was accomplished in 1998  by Pablo Besser, Mauricio Rojas, José Montt and  Rodrigo Fica. Nevertheless, some areas of the field remain largely unexplored

From the air, initial exploration was conducted in 1928–29 by Gunther Plüschow after whom a glacier is named. It was further studied in 1943 by aerial photographs made by the United States Air Force on request of the Chilean government.

Borderline 

Fifty kilometers of the Chile–Argentina border, between Mount Fitz Roy and Cerro Murallón, remain undefined on the ice field.

This Southern Patagonian Ice Field section of the border is the last remaining border issue between Chile and Argentina. On 1 August 1991 the governments of Chile and Argentina agreed on a borderline, but the agreement was never ratified by the Argentine legislature. Later, in 1998, both governments agreed that the line would run along the high peaks and watershed (as specified in their 1941 treaty) northward from Cerro Murallón to a point on a line of latitude due west of "Section B" that was specified in the 1998 agreement a few km southwest of Mt. Fitz roy.  However, they also agreed that final demarcation and exact location of the line there would wait until completion of a detailed 1:50,000 scale map of the area and further negotiations.  To date, this one section remains the final non-concluded boundary section and an occasional irritant in Argentina-Chile relations.

Controversy

In 2006, the Argentine Instituto Geográfico Militar (IGM) (today Instituto Geográfico Nacional)  edited a map without a note about the nondefined border but showed the Argentine claims as the official borderline. After Chilean diplomatic protests, the Argentine government withdrew the map and urged Chile to expedite the demarcation of the international border that had already been established by both countries in the 1881 treaty. However, many in Chile consider the border to have been established by the "Laudo of 1902," which was an agreement signed "to perpetuity" by both countries under British tutelage. The map published by the British Crown, as part of the documentation of the "Laudo of 1902", illustrates a clear demarcation line (from the Fitz Roy to the Stokes) to the east of the Southern Patagonian Ice Fields leaving most of the territory in question in the Chilean side (Santis, 1995:3–7). That is the cartography used by many international map publishers for many decades, but since 2007, some new international maps show the Argentine claim as the border line.

In January 2008, technicians of both countries began the final demarcation of the border.

In 2018, Argentina made a National Ice Inventory in which are included some disputed glaciers.
From September 20 to October 4 of the same year, the Argentine army traveled to into the area that is pending to be demarcated.
This caused controversy mainly in Chile where the mayor of Villa O'Higgins denounced the fact as a "provocation" and made a call to the central government of Chile to reinforce the sovereignty in the zone.

After the Argentine government published its inventory of glaciers including undefined territory the Chilean Foreign Ministry informed that a claim note had already been sent denying the Argentine inventory.

See also

 Southern Patagonian Ice Field dispute
 Northern Patagonian Ice Field
 Circo de los Altares
 List of glaciers
 Argentina-Chile relations
 Laguna del Desierto incident
 Beagle conflict
 Puna de Atacama dispute
 Glaciarium (museum)

Notes

References

External links

 Expedición Transpatagonia 2007, Campo de Hielo Patagónico Sur. Primera exploración histórica del Cordón del Gaviotín y del Lago Greve
 Expeditions in the SP Ice Field
  "Glaciers of the Wet Andes" by Louis Lliboutry, USGS
 South Patagonian Icefield, NASA Earth Observatory, 2017. Includes new satellite imagery.
 Subsecretario argentino de turismo dice que mapa de Campos de Hielo es oficial  "El Mercurio", Chile  29 August 2006
 Hielos Continentales: reclamo de Chile por los mapas argentinos Clarín, Argentina 29 August 2006
 Tras la fricción por los Hielos Continentales, la Argentina llama a Chile a demarcar los límites "lo antes posible" Clarín, 30 August 1996

Glaciers of Aysén Region
Glaciers of Argentina
Landforms of Santa Cruz Province, Argentina
Última Esperanza Province
Landforms of Argentina
Bodies of ice of Magallanes Region
Ice fields of South America